Oakwood is a village in Cuyahoga County, Ohio, United States. The population was 3,667 at the 2010 census. It is an inner ring suburb of Cleveland.

Geography

Demographics

2010 census
As of the census of 2010, there were 3,667 people, 1,544 households, and 935 families living in the village. The racial makeup of the village was 30.7% White, 64.7% African American, 0.2% Native American, 0.7% Asian, 0.1% Pacific Islander, 0.2% from other races, and 3.4% from two or more races. Hispanic or Latino of any race were 2.3% of the population.

There were 1,544 households, of which 24.6% had children under the age of 18 living with them, 38.3% were married couples living together, 17.2% had a female householder with no husband present, 5.1% had a male householder with no wife present, and 39.4% were non-families. 35.0% of all households were made up of individuals, and 12.3% had someone living alone who was 65 years of age or older. The average household size was 2.28 and the average family size was 2.94.

The median age in the village was 46.7 years. 18.7% of residents were under the age of 18; 7.7% were between the ages of 18 and 24; 21.5% were from 25 to 44; 32.9% were from 45 to 64; and 19.3% were 65 years of age or older. The gender makeup of the village was 47.6% male and 52.4% female.

2000 census
As of the census of 2000, there were 3,667 people, 1,416 households, and 877 families living in the village. The population density was 1,060.1 people per square mile (409.2/km2). There were 1,480 housing units at an average density of 427.9 per square mile (165.2/km2). The racial makeup of the village was 40.66% White, 56.23% African American, 0.19% Native American, 0.35% Asian, 0.03% Pacific Islander, 0.71% from other races, and 1.83% from two or more races. Hispanic or Latino of any race were 1.39% of the population.

There were 1,416 households, out of which 23.2% had children under the age of 18 living with them, 44.1% were married couples living together, 13.3% had a female householder with no husband present, and 38.0% were non-families. 33.6% of all households were made up of individuals, and 14.3% had someone living alone who was 65 years of age or older. The average household size was 2.43 and the average family size was 3.13.

In the village, the population was spread out, with 21.5% under the age of 18, 7.4% from 18 to 24, 23.5% from 25 to 44, 26.8% from 45 to 64, and 20.8% who were 65 years of age or older. The median age was 44 years. For every 100 females there were 87.8 males. For every 100 females age 18 and over, there were 86.0 males.

The median income for a household in the village was $39,404, and the median income for a family was $54,375. Males had a median income of $35,806 versus $30,735 for females. The per capita income for the village was $19,408. About 2.9% of families and 6.3% of the population were below the poverty line, including 3.0% of those under age 18 and 17.0% of those age 65 or over.

Government
Oakwood was incorporated in 1951. In 1968 it enacted a home rule charter. The village is governed by a mayor-council form of government, with full-time services. Public safety services are provided by a full-time police department and a part-time fire department. The village also conducts its own mayor's court.

Notable person
 Halle Berry, Academy Award-winning actress

See also
 Oakwood, Montgomery County, Ohio
 Oakwood, Paulding County, Ohio

References

External links
 Village website
 Police department

Villages in Cuyahoga County, Ohio
Villages in Ohio
Cleveland metropolitan area